Jeanne Malivel (15 April 1895 – 2 September 1926) was a Breton designer and illustrator who inspired the Breton nationalist art movement Seiz Breur.

Originally from Loudéac, she revived the art of woodblock printing in her illustrations for the Breton nationalist book The History of our Brittany by Jeanne Coroller-Danio in 1922. These illustrations were influenced by the earlier Synthetism of Paul Gauguin and Émile Bernard.

The images were greatly admired by René-Yves Creston, who considered them to provide the basis for a revived Breton style in art. Creston collaborated with Malivel on a number of works and in the pair set up Seiz Breur, which quickly grew in influence. The title of the movement was derived from a folk story about seven brothers ("seiz Breur" in Breton) collected and published by Malivel.

Malivel also painted works in fresco, and designed furniture, embroidery and ceramics. She participated in the International Exhibition of Decorative Arts and Modern Industry in 1925, showing furniture collaboratively designed with Creston. Following her sudden and early death at the age of 31 in the following year, leadership of the movement fell to Creston.

References

1895 births
1926 deaths
People from Loudéac
Breton nationalists
Breton artists
Breton women
French decorative artists
French illustrators
French women illustrators
Fresco painters
20th-century French painters
20th-century French women
French embroiderers